One Dollar Beach or Dollar Beach is a public beach on the north coast of East Timor, east north east of Dili, the capital city. It is long, white, sandy and clean, and also frequently deserted, yet popular with beach users at other times.

Etymology
The beach's name dates back only to about the start of this century, when East Timor was a United Nations protectorate. At that time, local people would charge visitors  for every car arriving and parking at the beach.

Geography

Long, spacious and frequently deserted, the beach is nevertheless popular at other times with families, including children, and also tourists and travellers.

The beach is composed of clean, soft snow-white sand sloping gently towards the water. It forms part of the south shore of Wetar Strait. The sea floor near the shore is sandy and the water is crystal-clear. Further out, there is a reef suitable for snorkelling and diving.
 
Often visible from the shore are pods of dolphins, and, in season, also whales. Underwater attractions at the reef include tropical fish and sea turtles.

The IBA extends from sea level to the isolated peak of Mount Curi, and is mostly steep to moderately steep hills. Below about  AMSL, its dominant vegetation is Eucalyptus alba savanna woodland, with a tall understorey of mostly Heteropogon and Themeda grasses.

Facilities
There are few facilities at the beach other than a handful of restaurants or stalls, which offer inexpensive fish meals.

See also
 Areia Branca Beach
 Cristo Rei Beach
 Jesus Backside Beach
 Valu Beach

References

External links

Beaches of East Timor
Manatuto Municipality